Calame's bent-toed gecko (Cyrtodactylus calamei) is a species of lizard in the family Gekkonidae. The species is endemic to Laos.

Etymology
The specific name, calamei, is in honor of naturalist and environmentalist Thomas Calame.

Geographic range
C. calamei is found in central Laos, in Khammouane Province.

Habitat

Description
Females are larger than males. The largest recorded female is about  SVL, while the largest recorded male is about  SVL.

Behavior
C. calamei is nocturnal.

Reproduction
The mode of reproduction of C. calamei is unknown.

References

Further reading
Luu VQ, Bonkowski M, Nguyen TQ, Le MD, Schneider N, Ngo HT, Ziegler T (2016). "Evolution in karst massifs: Cryptic diversity among bent-toed geckos along the Truong Son Range with descriptions of three new species and one new country record from Laos". Zootaxa 4107 (2): 101–140. (Cyrtodactylus calamei, new species).

Cyrtodactylus
Reptiles described in 2016